McFarland & Company, Inc., is an American independent book publisher based in Jefferson, North Carolina, that specializes in academic and reference works, as well as general-interest adult nonfiction. Its president is Rhonda Herman. Its former president and current editor-in-chief is Robert Franklin, who founded the company in 1979. McFarland employs a staff of about 50, and  had published 7,800 titles. McFarland's initial print runs average 600 copies per book.

Subject matter
McFarland & Company focuses mainly on selling to libraries. It also utilizes direct mailing to connect with enthusiasts in niche categories. The company is known for its sports literature, especially baseball history, as well as books about chess, military history, and film. In 2007, the Mountain Times wrote that McFarland publishes about 275 scholarly monographs and reference book titles a year; Robert Lee Brewer reported in 2015 that the number is about 350.

Publications

Notable book series
The following book series are among those published by McFarland & Company:
 "Contributions to Zombie Studies" (edited by Kyle William Bishop)
 "Critical Explorations in Science Fiction and Fantasy" (edited by C. W. Sullivan III and Donald Palumbo)

Scholarly journals
The following academic journals are published by McFarland & Company:
 Base Ball: A Journal of the Early Game – focuses on "baseball's early history, from its protoball roots to 1920"
 Black Ball: A Journal of the Negro Leagues – focuses on "all subjects related to black baseball, including the Negro major and minor leagues, and pre–Negro league play"
 Clues: A Journal of Detection – focuses on "all aspects of mystery and detective material in print, television and movies"
 Journal of Information Ethics – focuses on information ethics and information science
 Journal of Territorial and Maritime Studies – focuses on "global territorial and maritime issues"
 North Korean Review – focuses on an understanding of North Korea's "complexities and the threat it presents to global stability"

References

External links
 

Book publishing companies based in North Carolina
Companies based in North Carolina
Publishing companies established in 1979
Publishing companies of the United States